Karpovskoye is a rural locality (a village) in Botanovskoye Rural Settlement, Mezhdurechensky District, Vologda Oblast, Russia. The population was 14 as of 2002.

Geography 
Karpovskoye is located 42 km southwest of Shuyskoye (the district's administrative centre) by road. Ognevo is the nearest rural locality.

References 

Rural localities in Mezhdurechensky District, Vologda Oblast